Lego Art is a Lego theme introduced in 2020. It offers sets based on iconic personalities and characters in pop culture, allowing builders to reproduce them in a mosaic-like format using Lego 1x1 studs. Following the launch of Lego DOTS, a theme mainly targeted towards children, the Lego Art theme is the second 2D tile creative concept to be launched by The Lego Group in August 2020.

Overview 
The product line focuses on the artwork portraits. Each set is 48x48 studs in size and contains at least 2,900 pieces. Built upon nine 16x16 baseplates and connected by Lego Technic pins, each mosaic is formed using either round 1x1 tiles or round 1x1 plates. Although each set offers more than one design variation, they are unable to be built simultaneously. Some sets also give builders the option to combine multiples of the same set to create a larger piece. A wall hanging element is included for builders to hang the completed mosaic up. In addition, a new, larger brick separator is also introduced in this theme. Each set also comes with an exclusive 2x4 printed tile, featuring the mosaic's respective signature or logo, which can be added to the corner of the completed mosaic.

Podcasts or soundtracks that are intended to be listened to, when building the mosaics, are available online after purchasing a set. They feature creators or experts discussing the inspiration behind each design or the subject featured in the mosaic.

In 2023, Cooper Wright had set the Guinness Record completed World Map (set number: 31203) with a fastest time in 9 hours, 14 minutes and 49 seconds.

Development 
Lego Art is a new theme from The Lego Group that forms part of a strategy to create new products to appeal to adults some of whom will never have built with Lego elements before. Model Designer Kitt Grace Kossmann explained, "We have done something with the building instructions that is different to what we are used to," and continued, "There is a colour bar and that colour bar is represented by all the different bags, so when you build it's much easier. You can say 'number seven, that was the light blue one,' then you can see here as well as just colours there are numbers on it."

Lego Art introduces exclusive new elements, an expanded colour palette and is an entry point for new fans. Model Designer Kitt Grace Kossmann explained, "Some of them are up to four to seven percent extra so you get a lot of extra bricks," and continued, "Where you can reuse, as you can see for example in The Beatles, the skin colour was easy to mingle around and do on all of them, then for example Marilyn Monroe where you have different backgrounds, you needed a spare colour. In that one I had to use more extra bricks than in The Beatles. I wouldn't say that we have been compromising, we decided to make it as good as possible."

During the development process of the Lego Art theme, Model Designer Kitt Grace Kossmann explained, "One of the reasons why some of them have tiles is actually the plates, when you look at them, they look much more smooth, they were really looking nice. But also I think the one with the studs on cater also for Lego fans, being a Star Wars fan and Lego fan is really combined nicely in that one, whereas this one is perhaps more appealing to not super fans."

Lego Art Design Manager Samuel Johnson discussed the combination of 1x1 round plates and 1x1 round tiles on the same mosaic achieve unique shading effects and explained, "That is something that was considered during development and we cannot exclude the possibility of combining them in the future. However, that can cause challenges when developing the building instructions because differentiating between 1x1 round plates and 1x1 round tiles of the same colour may be difficult. The issue becomes even more prevalent within these sets because their instructions feature an unusual top-down view, showing the mosaic in two dimensions."

Lego Art Design Manager Samuel Johnson discussed the soundtracks accompany each model and explained, "Each set features its own soundtrack which has been developed exclusively for these products. The building instructions feature a QR code to access the soundtrack and they are about ninety minutes in length. They discuss the background behind the subjects being constructed. 31200 Star Wars The Sith, for instance, features commentary from Lucasfilm employees about the design of each character and their original development. Moreover, the soundtracks conclude with designer interviews so the creators of each mosaic can provide some information about the production of Lego Art."

Launch 
The Lego Art theme was announced on 24 August 2020 in the USA. As part of the marketing campaign, the Lego Group released four construction sets.

Construction sets

Andy Warhol's Marilyn Monroe 
Released on 1 August 2020, Andy Warhol's Marilyn Monroe (set number: 31197) is based on the Marilyn Diptych painting by Andy Warhol. It consists of 3,341 pieces and offers builders four different colour options. The accompanying soundtrack includes interviews with a curator at The Andy Warhol Museum named Jessica Black, and Blake Gopnik, an art critic. In August 2021, The Lego Group announced Andy Warhol's Marilyn Monroe (set number: 31197) was retired on 31 December 2021.

The Beatles 
Released on 1 August 2020, The Beatles (set number: 31198) is based on The Beatles rock band from England. It consists of 2,933 pieces and offers builders the option to recreate any one of the four members. The accompanying soundtrack includes interviews with a broadcaster and Beatles expert named Geoff Lloyd, a British journalist and Beatles fan named Samira Ahmed, and Nish Kumar, a comedian, TV presenter, and Beatles fan. In August 2021, The Lego Group announced The Beatles (set number: 31198) was retired on 31 December 2021.

Marvel Studios Iron Man 
Released on 1 August 2020, Marvel Studios Iron Man (set number: 31199) is based on the fictional Marvel Comics superhero, Iron Man. It consists of 3,167 pieces and offers builders the option to recreate any one of the Iron Man suit variations, namely the MK-III, MK-83, and the Hulkbuster MK-I. Three of the same set can also be combined to create an ultimate Iron Man piece. The accompanying soundtrack includes interviews with the former Marvel editor-in-chief, Roy Thomas, and Alex Grand, a Marvel expert, and host of the "Comic Book Historians" podcast. In August 2021, The Lego Group announced Marvel Studios Iron Man (set number: 31199) was retired on 31 December 2021.

Star Wars The Sith 
Released on 1 August 2020, Star Wars The Sith (set number: 31200) is based on the main antagonists of Star Wars. It consists of 3,406 pieces and offers builders the option to recreate any one of the three Star Wars characters namely Darth Maul, Kylo Ren and Darth Vader. Three of the same set can also be combined to create an ultimate Darth Vader piece. The accompanying soundtrack includes interviews with the vice president and executive creator director of Lucasfilm, Doug Chiang, and Glyn Dillion, creator of the design for Kylo Ren. In August 2021, The Lego Group announced Star Wars The Sith (set number: 31200) was retired on 31 December 2021.

Harry Potter Hogwarts Crests 
Released on 1 January 2021, Harry Potter Hogwarts Crests (set number: 31201) is based on the Hogwarts house crests in Harry Potter. It consists of 4,249 pieces and offers builders the option to recreate any one of the four Hogwarts house crests namely Gryffindor, Slytherin, Hufflepuff, and Ravenclaw. Four of the same set can also be combined to create an ultimate Hogwarts crest piece. The accompanying soundtrack includes interviews with the graphic designers for the Harry Potter and Fantastic Beasts films, Miraphora Mina, and Eduardo Lima, creative director for the Harry Potter films, Alan Gilmore, and the head prop maker for the Harry Potter and Fantastic Beasts films, Pierre Bohanna. Later, in April 2021, Lego released an alternative set of instructions to provide builders with additional build options namely Hedwig, the Platform 9¾ sign, and the Golden Snitch. In August 2021, The Lego Group announced Harry Potter Hogwarts Crests (set number: 31201) will be retiring on 31 December 2023.

Disney's Mickey Mouse 
Released on 1 January 2021, Disney's Mickey Mouse (set number: 31202) is based on the Disney cartoon characters of Mickey Mouse and Minnie Mouse. It consists of 2,658 pieces and offers builders the option to recreate either Mickey or Minnie Mouse. Two of the same set can also be combined to create a united Mickey Mouse and Minnie Mouse piece. The accompanying soundtrack includes interviews with Disney's creative director and character artist, David Pacheco, Disney's character artist, Jeff Shelly, Disney's principal character artist, Brian Blackmore, and Disney's senior character artist, Ron Cohee. Later, in April 2021, Lego released an alternative set of instructions to provide builders with additional options for recreating the characters. In August 2021, The Lego Group announced Disney's Mickey Mouse (set number: 31202) will be retiring on 31 December 2023.

World Map 
Released on 1 June 2021, World Map (set number: 31203), with a total of 11,695 pieces, is Lego's largest set to date where builders are able to recreate a map of the world. Builders are also able to customise the look of the oceans, either by following instructions inspired by the bathymetric mapping of the ocean floor, or placing them to their own liking. Tiles can be rearranged to create three different versions of the map, each of which centers on a different continent. The set also features customisable brick-built pins for builders to mark destinations on the map. The accompanying soundtrack includes interviews and travel stories from bloggers and adventurers such as Torbjørn C. Pedersen, who is the first person to visit every country in the world in one journey without flying. On 10 September 2021, The Lego Group had published instructions for two new alternate builds for World Map (set number: 31203) are Denmark and Europe. In August 2021, The Lego Group announced World Map (set number: 31203) will be retiring on 31 December 2023.

Art Project - Create Together 
Released on 18 October 2021, Art Project - Create Together (set number: 21226), with a total of 4,138 pieces, is the first set to not be based on a licensed theme and offers builders the option to recreate a total of 37 different designs to be built and combined into one larger mosaic. In September 2022, Art Project - Create Together (set number: 21226) will be retired at the end of 2022.

Elvis Presley 'The King' 
Released on 1 March 2022, Elvis Presley 'The King' (set number: 31204) is based on Elvis Presley an American singer and actor who was dubbed the "King of Rock and Roll". It consists of 3,445 pieces and offers builders the option to recreate any one of the three different Elvis Presley options. Three of the same set can also be combined to create Elvis Presley playing the guitar. In September 2022, Elvis Presley 'The King' (set number: 31204) will be retired at the end of 2022.

Jim Lee Batman Collection 
Released on 1 March 2022, Jim Lee Batman Collection (set number: 31205) is based on DC Comics superhero, Batman designed by Jim Lee. It consists of 4,167 pieces and offers builders the option to recreate any one of the three DC Universe characters namely Batman, The Joker and Harley Quinn. Two of the same set can also be combined to create Batman and Catwoman piece. In addition, three of the same set can also be combined to create an ultimate Batman piece. In an interview, Jim Lee stated, "We have our style and so how do you translate it given these parameters, and still make it look visually aesthetically cool, but also recognizably ours and I think that was a big hurdle,” and continued, “First, it was converting the mindset to a different medium. And knowing the image was in a square format was one of the largest considerations.”

Rolling Stones 
Released on 1 June 2022, Rolling Stones (set number: 31206) is based on The Rolling Stones rock band from England. It consists of 1,998 pieces. The accompanying soundtrack includes interviews with the Graphic Designer John Pasche. John Pasche commented, “Who would have believed, 50 odd years ago… that design would be made into a Lego piece. Wow!”. Lego Design Manager Fiorella Groves explained, “Since the tongue logo is one of the most recognized logos, our biggest challenge was to figure out how we could get the Lego Art design as close to the original as possible. Previous sets have been created with 1×1 round Lego tiles as a mosaic, but this time, in the spirit of being more Rock ‘n’ Roll, we have used the full spectrum of Lego bricks to capture the organic curves that John created. Hearing his reaction to our final design makes me so happy!”

Floral Art 
Released on 1 August 2022, Floral Art (set number: 31207), with a total of 2,870 pieces.

Hokusai: The Great Wave 
Released on 1 January 2023, Hokusai: The Great Wave (set number: 31208) is based on Japanese ukiyo-e artist Katsushika Hokusai's The Great Wave off Kanagawa woodblock print. It consists of 1,810 pieces. The accompanying soundtrack includes interviews with the art curators Naoko Mikami and Alfred Haft.

Reception 
In July 2020, Lego Art was shortlisted for the Play Creators Awards 2020.

In September 2022, Jim Lee Batman Collection (set number: 31205) was listed on the "Five of the best Lego Batman sets for Batman Day 2022" by Lego fansite BrickFanatics.

In February 2023, World Map (set number: 31203) was listed as "The biggest Lego sets of all time" by Lego fansite Brick Fanatics.

See also 
 Lego DOTS
 Lego BrickHeadz
 Lego Brick Sketches
 Lego Super Heroes
 Lego Disney
 Lego Star Wars
 Lego Harry Potter

References

External links
 

Lego themes
Products introduced in 2020